Ben Heyes (born 5 October 1998) is a  rugby league player who plays as a  for the Swinton Lions in the Betfred Championship.

Playing career

Thatto Heath Crusaders
Heyes was part of the team that beat North Wales Crusaders in a 16–14 victory in the Challenge Cup on 30 March 2019.
He had taken part in a tour with England Community Lions RL in October 2019.

Swinton Lions
On 18 November 2019, Heyes signed a one-year deal with Swinton Lions
On 26 August 2020, he signed an extended one-year contract
He made his debut for Swinton Lions against Leigh Miners Rangers in a 56–0 win.

References

External links
Swinton Lions profile

1998 births
Living people
English rugby league players
Rugby league fullbacks
Rugby league players from St Helens, Merseyside
Swinton Lions players